A non-conforming loan is a loan that fails to meet bank criteria for funding. 

Reasons include the loan amount is higher than the conforming loan limit (for mortgage loans), lack of sufficient credit, the unorthodox nature of the use of funds, or the collateral backing it. In many cases, non-conforming loans can be funded by hard money lenders, or private institutions/money. A large portion of real-estate loans are qualified as non-conforming because either the borrower's financial status or the property type does not meet bank guidelines. Non-conforming loans can be either Alt-A or subprime loans.

The flexibility of private money can allow for a much wider range of deals to be funded, although more detailed and substantive collateral and documentation may be required by a lender.

Selecting a Non-Conforming Lender 
Borrowers should select non-conforming lenders in the same careful way they would shop for any other loan. Look for good rates and especially a good customer service rating. Rates for non-conforming lenders are typically higher than those for banks, but terms are more flexible and loans more easily attainable. Many companies advertising non-conforming loans are brokers who refer the loans requests they field to lenders.

Types of Non-Conforming Loans 
Commercial non-conforming loans are also known as hard money loans, and comprise a large portion of all non-conforming loans. They are used to fund industrial and retail projects like RV parks, theatre complexes, gas stations, medical centers and more. Many commercial non-conforming loans are bridge loans. 

Residential non-conforming loans are strictly regulated, usually with much higher rates than banks. Some states have legal limits against non-conforming loans for residential real estate.

See also
Conforming Loan
Asset-based Loan: A similar type of commercial loan based on real estate, indicating the loan will be based upon a percentage of the properties appraised value, as the key criteria.
Bridge Loan: A similar type of commercial loan based on real estate
Hard Money: A similar type of commercial loan based on real estate
Commercial Loan: Standard, broad types of loans based on commercial property value

External links
 

Credit
Loans